James Kreglo (born August 8, 1956) is a fencer from the United States Virgin Islands. He competed in the individual foil and sabre events at the 1984 Summer Olympics.

References

External links
 

1956 births
Living people
United States Virgin Islands male sabre fencers
Olympic fencers of the United States Virgin Islands
Fencers at the 1984 Summer Olympics
Sportspeople from Huntington, West Virginia
United States Virgin Islands male foil fencers